The Louis W. Harris House, at 55 E. 200 North in Beaver, Utah, was built in 1905.  It was listed on the National Register of Historic Places in 1983.

It was built by stonemason Louis W. Harris for himself and his family.

See also
Louis W. Harris Flour Mill, also National Register-listed

References

National Register of Historic Places in Beaver County, Utah
Houses completed in 1905
1905 establishments in Utah